The Alliance for the Lost Boys of Sudan is a 501 C-3 all-volunteer foundation in Jacksonville, Florida, established in 2004, to meet the health and educational needs of Lost Boys and their siblings living in Africa and the United States.

History
The alliance for the Lost Boys of Sudan was founded in 2004 by Joan Hecht.

Description 
The Alliance also provides humanitarian aid in Southern Sudan to include the construction of X-ray clinics and medicine for local hospitals, the drilling of eight water wells to provide clean water for rural villagers, houses and beds for children in Sudanese orphanages, funds to aid in the construction of schools and school supplies for students, goat programs for women at risk, distribution of solar lights to rural villagers and various other projects.

In addition to their humanitarian efforts in Southern Sudan, the Alliance has assisted over sixty five Lost Boys and US South Sudanese with college tuition and books and has provided medical assistance to over 100 Lost Boys and girls living in Jacksonville, Fl.

References

External links 
 Official website

Charities based in Florida
The Journey of the Lost Boys
Organizations for orphaned and abandoned children
Foreign charities operating in South Sudan
Non-profit organizations based in Jacksonville, Florida
Organizations established in 2004
2004 establishments in Florida